Nikkei Brazilians at a Brazilian School in Japan: Factors Affecting Language Decisions and Education is a 2008 English-language book by Toshiko Sugino (杉野 俊子 Sugino Toshiko), published by the Keio University Press. The book discusses a Brazilian school located in Hamamatsu, Japan and the Brazilian community of that city. The book has a focus on how Brazilians in the city decide whether to use Brazilian schools or traditional Japanese public schools.

Sugino cited Gordon, who conducted a survey with a sample of Brazilians and conducted interviews of Brazilian school teachers and staff as well as Brazilian parents.

References
Gordon, June A. (University of California, Santa Cruz). "Sugino, Toshiko (2008) Nikkei Brazilians at a Brazilian School in Japan: Factors Affecting Language Decisions and Education. Tokyo: Keio University Press." (Archive" (Archive). Education Review. (book review). February 12, 2011.

Notes

Further reading
 Adachi, Nobuko. "Nikkei Brazilians at a Brazilian School in Japan: Factors Affecting Language Decisions and Education by Toshiko Sugino" (paywall). World Englishes. Volume 28, Issue 3, pages 413–416, September 2009. First posted online 3 August 2009. DOI: 10.1111/j.1467-971X.2009.01600_4.x.
 Sugino, Toshiko, Ed. D. (Temple University). "Nikkei Brazilians at a Brazilian school in Japan: Factors affecting language decisions and education" (PhD thesis). Temple University, 2007. Publication Number 3293262. 
 See profile at Google Books.

2008 non-fiction books
Books about Japan
Hamamatsu